Nathalie Des Rosiers  (born 1959) is a lawyer, academic and former politician in Ontario, Canada. She is the 6th and current Principal of Massey College at the University of Toronto. She was a Liberal member of the Legislative Assembly of Ontario representing the riding of Ottawa—Vanier from 2016 to 2019. During her tenure as a Member of Provincial Parliament, Des Rosiers served in the cabinet of Kathleen Wynne as Minister of Natural Resources and Forestry.

Background
She was born in Montreal, studied law at the Université de Montréal and received a LLM from Harvard University. Des Rosiers clerked at the Supreme Court of Canada and practised law in London, Ontario with Lerners LLP. She also was a law professor at the University of Western Ontario. She then served as dean of the civil law section at the University of Ottawa. She was president of the Law Commission of Canada from 2004 to 2008. Des Rosiers served as general counsel for the Canadian Civil Liberties Association (CCLA) from 2009 to 2013, when she returned to serve as dean of the common law section at the University of Ottawa until 2016.

During the 2010 G20 Toronto summit, Des Rosiers uncovered a provision invoked by the provincial government which greatly expanded police powers near a security fence on the perimeter of the summit's location. She brought this issue to the attention of the Canadian press and ensured that CCLA volunteers monitored the Toronto police for civil liberties violations during the conference. She also helped to discourage the practice of "carding", where police stop people who are not suspected of any criminal activity, ask for their identification and record that information for later review.

Honours
Des Rosiers was inducted into the Order of Ontario in 2012, and was inducted as a Member of the Order of Canada in 2013 for her work in civil rights and Francophone advocacy, and was accepted as a Fellow of the Royal Society of Canada in 2014. She was named one of Canada's 10 "nation builders" by the Globe and Mail in 2014 and was named one of Canada's 25 most influential lawyers by Canadian Lawyer in 2011 and in 2012.

Politics
She was chosen as Liberal candidate for a November 2016 by-election to be held in the Ontario riding of Ottawa—Vanier following the resignation of Madeleine Meilleur. In that by-election she defeated Progressive Conservative challenger and former Ontario ombudsman Andre Marin.

Des Rosiers served as Parliamentary Assistant to the Minister of Energy and Parliamentary Assistant to the Minister of Intergovernmental Affairs. She was later appointed Minister of Natural Resources and Forestry. She was re-elected in the 2018 general election.

She announced on May 16, 2019 that she would resign her seat in the legislature to become Principal of Massey College at the University of Toronto effective August 1, 2019.

Election results

Cabinet positions

References

External links

Order of Canada citation

1959 births
21st-century Canadian politicians
21st-century Canadian lawyers
21st-century Canadian women politicians
Canadian women lawyers
Franco-Ontarian people
Harvard Law School alumni
Lawyers in Ontario
Living people
Massey College, Toronto
Members of the Executive Council of Ontario
Members of the Order of Canada
Members of the Order of Ontario
Ontario Liberal Party MPPs
Politicians from Montreal
Politicians from Ottawa
Université de Montréal Faculty of Law alumni
Academic staff of the University of Ottawa
Academic staff of the University of Western Ontario
Women government ministers of Canada
Women MPPs in Ontario
21st-century women lawyers